Greatest Hits 3 is a compilation album by American country music group The Oak Ridge Boys. It was released in 1989 via MCA Records. The album peaked at number 22 on the Billboard Top Country Albums chart.

Although Steve Sanders is featured on the cover of the album, several tracks include William Lee Golden on vocals, most notably "Touch A Hand, Make A Friend," which includes a solo by Golden.

Track listing

^The vocals on "True Heart" were re-recorded to match the live rendition more closely. This alternate version is exclusive to this album and has never been included on any other releases.

^^Previously released as a promotional single and video in 1987, this song was included as a "bonus track" for the compilation.

Chart performance

References

1989 greatest hits albums
The Oak Ridge Boys albums
Albums produced by Jimmy Bowen
Albums produced by Ron Chancey
MCA Records compilation albums